Polskie Sieci Elektroenergetyczne S.A. (abbreviated PSE) is an electricity transmission system operator in Poland and the sole operator of the country's high-voltage transmission lines. It is 100% owned by the State Treasury. 

Until 2007, PSE was a part of the PSE Group (now: Polska Grupa Energetyczna).

References

External links

 

Electric power transmission system operators in Poland
Energy in Poland